The 95th Pennsylvania House of Representatives District is located in South Central Pennsylvania and has been represented by Carol Hill-Evans since 2017.

District profile
The 95th District is located in York County and includes the following areas: 

North York Township 
Spring Garden Township
West York
York

Representatives

References

Government of York County, Pennsylvania
95